Sawsi (Quechua for willow or a species of willows, Hispanicized spelling Sauce) is a  mountain in the Andes of Peru. It is situated in the Arequipa Region, Castilla Province, on the border of the districts of Chachas and Orcopampa. Sawsi lies at a lake named Machuqucha.

References

Mountains of Peru
Mountains of Arequipa Region